Jorge Luis Montenegro Revelo (born 26 September 1988) is an Ecuadorian cyclist, who currently rides for UCI Continental team .

Major results

2007
 9th Overall Vuelta al Ecuador
1st Stage 9
2012
 2nd Overall Vuelta al Ecuador
1st Stage 7
2013
 1st Stage 10 Vuelta al Ecuador
2014
 National Road Championships
3rd Road race
4th Time trial
2015
 10th Road race, Pan American Road Championships
 10th Overall Vuelta Mexico Telmex
2017
 National Road Championships
1st  Time trial
2nd Road race
2018
 National Road Championships
2nd Time trial
3rd Road race
 7th Time trial, South American Games
2019
 1st  Overall Vuelta al Ecuador
1st Stage 2
 4th Road race, National Road Championships
2020
 10th Overall Vuelta al Ecuador
2021
 1st  Time trial, National Road Championships
 9th Overall Vuelta al Ecuador
 10th Time trial, Pan American Road Championships
2022
 2nd Time trial, National Road Championships

References

External links

1988 births
Living people
Ecuadorian male cyclists
People from Tulcán